Evelyn may refer to:

Places 
 Evelyn, London
Evelyn Gardens, a garden square in London
 Evelyn, Ontario, Canada
 Evelyn, Michigan, United States
 Evelyn, Texas, United States
 Evelyn, Wirt County, West Virginia, United States
 Evelyn (VTA), former light rail train station in Mountain View, California, United States
 Evelyn County, New South Wales, Australia
 Electoral district of Evelyn, an electoral district in Victoria, Australia
 Evelyn, Queensland, Australia
 503 Evelyn, a main belt asteroid

Schools 
 Evelyn College for Women, or Evelyn College, the former women's college of Princeton University
 Evelyn High School, in Bulawayo, Zimbabwe

Entertainment
 Evelyn (2002 film), a film starring Sophie Vavasseur and Pierce Brosnan
 Evelyn (2018 film), a documentary
 Evelyn: The Cutest Evil Dead Girl, 2002 short film and black comedy directed by Brad Peyton
 Evelyn (play), a 1969 radio play by Rhys Adrian
 Evelyn (EP), an EP by The Mess Hall
 "Evelyn", song by De Rosa 2006
 "Evelyn", a song by Volbeat from their album Beyond Hell/Above Heaven
 "Evilyn", a song by Entombed from their album Clandestine
 Evelyn, a minor character in Meta Runner
 Evelyn Couch, a character in the 1991 American comedy-drama movie Fried Green Tomatoes
 Evelyn Sader, a character in the novel A World Without Princes, by Soman Chainani
 Evelyn Bluedhorn Stratton, a character in Silver Spoons

Other
 Evelyn (name)
 Hurricane Evelyn, fifth hurricane of the 1977 Atlantic hurricane season
 , a British coaster in service under this name 1920–1943 and 1946–1957